The Women's 4x100 Medley Relay event at the 11th FINA World Aquatics Championships swam on 30 July 2005 in Montreal, Canada.

At the start of the event, the existing World (WR) and Championships (CR) records were:
WR: 3:57.32 swum by Australia on 21 August 2004 in Athens, Greece
CR: 3:59.89 swum by China on 26 July 2003 in Barcelona, Spain

Results

Final

Preliminaries

References

Swimming at the 2005 World Aquatics Championships
2005 in women's swimming